Heinz Körvers (3 July 1915 – 29 December 1942) was a German field handball player who competed in the 1936 Summer Olympics. He was part of the German field handball team, which won the gold medal. He played one match as goalkeeper.

He was killed in action during World War II.

References

External links
profile

1915 births
1942 deaths
German male handball players
Olympic handball players of Germany
Field handball players at the 1936 Summer Olympics
Olympic gold medalists for Germany
Olympic medalists in handball
Medalists at the 1936 Summer Olympics
German military personnel killed in World War II